Mark van Platen (born 1955) is a Dutch composer, conductor, organist and pianist. In 2004, he was presented a Gouden Kalf (Dutch equivalent of the Oscars) for his music score for the Dutch film Kees De Jongen.

Biography
Van Platen completed his education as an organist, choirmaster and pianist at the Brabants Conservatorium college of music in Tilburg under Maurice Pirenne, Cees Rotteveel and Ton Demmers. In 1992, he obtained the orchestra conductor's diploma at the Royal Conservatory of The Hague under Ed Spanjaard.

Works

List of works ( selection )
 Notre Père (1980) for women's choir
 Dance de Puck (1982) for ensemble
 Duo (1983) for violin and cello
 Musica Interrotta (1984) for bassoon and piano
 Variazioni (1985) for chamber ensemble
 Kleine suite (1986) for clarinet quartet
 Introductiemuziek Für Elise (1986) for ensemble
 Preludium-Intermezzo-Postludium (1986) for wind instruments and percussion
 Lamentations (1988) for wind instruments, percussion and guitar
 Drie monologen (1990) for organ
 Licht (2005) for ensemble
 Bewerking van Nederlandse volksliederen (2007) for men's choir
 Compositie voor Het Veldhovens Amateurorkest (2007) for ensemble
 Nunc Dimittis (2008) for men's choir
 Missa Ego Clamavi (2008) for children's choir
 Bewerkingen van delen uit de Midzomernachtsdroom (2009) for wind ensemble
 Lecture de Cioran (2010) for choir
 Attendite et videte (2012) for choir
 After visiting Rothko (2015) for organ

Filmography

References

External links

1955 births
Living people
20th-century classical composers
21st-century classical composers
Dutch classical pianists
Dutch classical organists
Male classical organists
Dutch conductors (music)
Male conductors (music)
Dutch film score composers
Dutch male classical composers
Dutch classical composers
Golden Calf winners
Royal Conservatory of The Hague alumni
Male classical pianists
20th-century conductors (music)
21st-century conductors (music)
21st-century classical pianists
21st-century organists
Male film score composers
20th-century Dutch male musicians
21st-century male musicians